The Ambassador of the United Kingdom to the Dominican Republic is the United Kingdom's foremost diplomatic representative to the Dominican Republic. 

From 1999 to 2015 the holder was also ambassador to the Republic of Haiti. In June 2012 the British Foreign Secretary announced that the UK was to open a new embassy in Haiti. In 2015 Sharon Isabel Campbell was appointed as dedicated ambassador to Haiti, but still to be non-resident, since she is married to the ambassador to the Dominican Republic, Christopher John Campbell. In 2019, Mockbul Ali was appointed as both Ambassador to the Dominican Republic and non-resident Ambassador to Haiti.

List of heads of mission

Chargé d’Affaires
1871–1874: Spenser St. John
1874–1883: Major Robert Stuart
There was no diplomatic agent there from 1883 until 1913

Minister Plenipotentiary
1913–1916: Stephen Leech
Military Government proclaimed by US Officers, 1916
1919–1921: William Erskine

Chargé d’Affaires
1921–1923: Claude Kirwood Ledger
1923–1925: Ralph Darrell Wilson
1925–1929: John Bowering
1929–1930: Wilfred Hansford Gallienne
1930–1932: Robert George Goldie
1932–1935: Harold Ernest Slaymaker

Minister Resident And Consul
1935–1943: Alexander Swinton (later Sir S.) Paterson

Minister Resident And Consul (later Envoy extraordinary And Minister Plenipotentiary)
1943–1945: Cyril Frank Wilton Andrews

Envoy extraordinary And Minister Plenipotentiary
1945–1948: Russell Duncan Macrae
1948–1951: Stanley Herbert Gudgeon

Ambassador Extraordinary And Plenipotentiary
1951–1953: Stanley Herbert Gudgeon
1953–1955: Herbert Gybbon-Monypenny
1955–1958: Thomas Corney Ravensdale
1958–1962: Wilfrid Wolters McVittie
1962–1965: Stephen Alexander Lockhart
1965–1969: Ian Wright Bell
1969–1972: Leslie Boas
1972–1976: Paul Victor St. John Killick
1976–1979: Clement Spearman
1979–1983: Michael Cafferty
1983–1985: Roy George Marlow
1985–1988: Michael Newington (non-resident, combined with Venezuela)
1988–1993: Giles FitzHerbert (non-resident, combined with Venezuela)
1993–1995: John Gerrard Flynn (non-resident, combined with Venezuela)
1995–1998: Dick Thomson
1998–2002: David Gordon Ward
2002–2006: Andrew Richard Ashcroft
2006–2009: Ian Alan Worthington
2009–2015: Steven Fisher
2015-2020: Chris Campbell

2020-: Mockbul Ali OBE

References

External links
UK and the Dominican Republic, gov.uk

Dominican Republic
 
United Kingdom